(September 18, 1952, in Kobe – March 6, 2004, in Honolulu) was a J-pop singer and dancer of Japanese and German descent. Later in her career, she became particularly known for her two Nikkatsu Roman Porno films released in 1976.

Music career
Takamura had been a member of Golden Half until the band's split in 1974. She released a solo album titled Tenshi no Asa (天使の朝) from Nippon Crown in 1975.

Film career
In 1976, Takamura played the title role in Masaru Konuma's nunsploitation film Cloistered Nun: Runa's Confession. She followed this film with Kōyū Ohara's Runa's Confession: "Men Crawling All Over Me" a semi-autobiographical, erotic retelling of her pop music career.

Filmography
Based on:
, 1970, cameo as a Golden Half member.
, 1974, Judy.
, 1976, Runa/Luna.
, 1976, herself.
, 1976, woman at the boutique.
, 1976, a performer.

Notes

1952 births
2004 deaths
Japanese women pop singers
Japanese film actresses
Pink film actors
People from Kobe
Japanese people of German descent
Deaths from cancer in Hawaii
20th-century Japanese women singers
20th-century Japanese singers